Hakurei Seamount is a seamount located off Adélie Land, Antarctica. The name, approved by the Advisory Committee for Undersea Features in July 1999, is for the RV Hakurei-maru which conducted a detailed survey of the area.

References

Seamounts of the Southern Ocean
Landforms of Adélie Land